HMS Blanche was a 1760-ton, 6-gun  wooden screw sloop built for the Royal Navy in the mid-1860s by Chatham Dockyard.

She was sent to the Australia Station in January 1868, arriving in April 1868. She undertook a punitive action against Solomon Island natives in September 1869. During 1870, she joined in the search for the schooner Daphne, which was unsuccessful. Under the command of Captain Cortland Simpson, she undertook a survey of Rabaul's Harbour in 1872. Blanche Bay is named after HMS Blanche. She finished service on the Australia Station in 1875. While sailing to England she was almost lost rounding Cape Horn in bad weather.

After being refitted and rearmed, she was sent to the North America and West Indies Station, where she remained until 1881.

Crew 

A memorial to Paymaster James McAvoy and Lieutenant Thomas Thompson Auderton Smith was erected in St James' Church, Sydney by the captain and officers of Blanche in 1872.

In 1871 the crew of Blanche (and HMS Rosario) were replaced by a new crew that sailed from the UK on HMS Megaera. However, it developed a serious leak in the Indian Ocean and was beached on Île Saint-Paul on 19 June 1871. They arrived on 2 October 1871, and Blanche was recommissioned on the 12th.

On 11 April 1872, Blanche was driven ashore on New Hanover Island. She was subsequently refloated. Repairs cost £2,450.

Fate
She was placed in reserve and in 1886 was sold to Castle for £3,600 for breaking.

Notes

Bibliography

Bastock, John (1988), Ships on the Australia Station, Child & Associates Publishing; Frenchs Forest, Australia. 

Rottman, Gordon L. (2001), World War II Pacific Island Guide: A Geo-Military Study, Greenwood Press; Santa Barbara, CA. 
 

 

Ships built in Chatham
Eclipse-class sloops
Victorian-era sloops of the United Kingdom
Victorian-era corvettes of the United Kingdom
1867 ships
Maritime incidents in April 1870